Erythrosuchus (from  , 'red' and  , 'crocodile') is an extinct genus of archosauriform reptile from the Triassic of South Africa. Remains have been found from the Cynognathus Assemblage Zone of the Beaufort Group in the Karoo of South Africa.

In the Late Triassic, the ecological niche left by Erythrosuchus was filled by archosaurs like Saurosuchus and Postosuchus.

Description

It walked on all fours and had limbs which were positioned semi-vertically under its body, unlike the more sprawling gait of most earlier reptiles.

Erythrosuchus was the largest erythrosuchid, but apart from its size, was largely similar in appearance to other related genera. It had a large head and comparatively short neck. One of the few distinguishing features of Erythrosuchus other than its size is the smoothness of the margin of the squamosal, a bone at the rear of the skull. In other erythrosuchids, the margin of this bone projects backward from the skull, giving it a hook-like appearance. In Erythrosuchus, the margin is convex and lacks a hook.

Discovery
 
Erythrosuchus is known from many specimens, most of which are fragmentary. The holotype, described by Robert Broom in 1905 and known as SAM 905, is poorly preserved. Only small pieces of the limbs, pectoral and pelvic girdles, skull, and a few vertebrae present in this specimen. A thorough description of the genus was given by German paleontologist Friedrich von Huene in 1911. The fossil material that served as the basis for the description is now housed in the Natural History Museum in London, England. Like the holotype, it is very fragmentary, and some specimens may even belong to the same individual as SAM 905. One specimen, known as BMNH R 3592, is relatively more complete, with much of the postcranial skeleton intact. 
 
Early restorations of the skull of Erythrosuchus depicted it as being tall, similar in appearance to the theropod genus Tyrannosaurus. However, a complete skull that was later described in 1963 revealed that the true shape was less tall than previously thought. This skull, known as BPI 5207 and currently part of the collection of the Bernard Price Institute for Palaeontological Research in South Africa, has a somewhat pointed snout. Earlier restorations may have shown a deeper snout because it was not known at the time how the bones of the skull articulated with one another. Supposed Erythrosuchus fossils reported from the Omingonde Formation of Namibia were later described as Etjosuchus, a "rauisuchian" (loricatan) archosaur.

The braincase has also been studied, and possesses features that are shared with other early archosauriforms. Many of these characteristics are considered plesiomorphic, or ancestral, in archosaurs. While Erythrosuchus is not considered an archosaur, it is thought to be closely related to the last common ancestor of all archosaurs.

Classification

The hypothetical last common ancestor of archosaurs is thought to have shared many features with Erythrosuchus, many of which are found in the braincase. For example, the inner part of the otic capsule (the skeletal structure surrounding the inner ear) is not entirely ossified, or completely formed of bone. Neither is the channel for the perilymphatic duct, which is a tube that leaves the lagena. The lagena is the portion of the inner ear responsible for hearing, and is known as the cochlea in mammals (although in mammals it is coiled rather than straight). Erythrosuchus has a short lagena, which is also expected in the last common ancestor of all archosaurs.

Some features of the ankle of Erythrosuchus suggest that it was beginning to adapt toward digitigrady, or walking on toes rather than having the entire foot placed on the ground. The ankle is similar to that of Euparkeria; the ankles of both of these animals are more advanced than those of other archosauriformes.

References 

Middle Triassic reptiles of Africa
Early Triassic reptiles of Africa
Erythrosuchids
Prehistoric reptile genera
Triassic reptiles of Africa
Triassic South Africa
Fossils of South Africa
Fossil taxa described in 1905
Taxa named by Robert Broom